Oksana Fadina (born July 3, 1976, Bolsherechye, Omsk Oblast) is a Russian politician and a deputy of the 8th State Duma.

In 2006 she was awarded a Doctor of Sciences degree in economics. The same year she was appointed the head of the sector of economic analysis and financial planning of the Ministry of Oil Processing of the Omsk oblast (liquidated in 2008). On July 18, 2012, she was appointed Deputy Minister of Economy of the Omsk Region. She left the post in 2013 to become the deputy director of Omskgorgaz. In 2015 she returned to the civil service and became the First Deputy Minister of Economy of the Omsk Region. On October 30, 2015, she became the Minister of Economy of the Omsk Region. In 2017 she was elected the Mayor of Omsk. She left the post in 2021 to become a deputy of the 8th State Duma.

References

1976 births
Living people
United Russia politicians
21st-century Russian politicians
Eighth convocation members of the State Duma (Russian Federation)